Sintra (Santa Maria e São Miguel, São Martinho e São Pedro de Penaferrim) is a civil parish in the municipality of Sintra, Lisbon District, Portugal. It was formed in 2013 by the merger of the former parishes Santa Maria e São Miguel, São Martinho and São Pedro de Penaferrim. The population in 2011 was 29,591, in an area of 63.55 km².

References

Parishes of Sintra